Labanotation (grammatically correct form "Labannotation" or "Laban notation" is uncommon) is a system for analyzing and recording human movement (notation system), invented by Austro-Hungarian choreographer and dance Rudolf von Laban (1879-1958, a central figure in European modern dance), who developed his notation on movements in the 1920s.

History
Laban's first book on the subject was published in German in 1928 called Schrifttanz (Written Dance); a similar version in French and English appeared in 1930. A few years later Laban's interest turned to other matters and he gave his notation system to the world. The German dancer, choreographer and pedagogue Albrecht Knust, who by 1930 had together with Laban's daughter Azra (Azraela) established the Tanz-Schreib-Stube (the first Dance Notation Bureau), was the first-ever full-time kinetographer-movement notator. Between 1946-1950 Knust wrote his major work Das Handbuch der Kinetographie Laban (The Manual of Kinetography Laban) in eight-volumes in German, typed carbon copies appeared in 1951 in English. Ann Hutchinson Guest and former student of Sigurd Leeder, studied the system differences among and between the various practitioners taught by former Laban student Irma Betz, and had the opportunity to confer with Laban, Knust and Leeder personally on movement details and ideas, developed it further naming it Labanotation. The two systems differ somewhat.

Laban's notation system is used as a type of dance notation in other applications including Laban Movement Analysis, robotics and human movement simulation. With Labanotation, any form of human movement can be recorded: The basis is natural human movement, every change must be noted.

This notation system could be used to describe movement in terms of spatial models and concepts, which contrasts with other movement notation systems based on anatomical analysis, letter codes, stick figures, music notes, track systems, or word notes. The system precisely and accurately portrays temporal patterns, actions, floor plans, body parts and a three-dimensional use of space. Laban's notation system eventually evolved into modern-day Labanotation and Kinetography Laban.

Labanotation and Kinetography Laban evolved separately in the 1930s through 1950s, Labanotation in the United States and England, and Kinetography Laban in Germany and other European countries. As a result of their different evolutionary paths, Kinetography Laban hasn't changed significantly since inception, whereas Labanotation evolved over time to meet new needs. For example, at the behest of members of the Dance Notation Bureau, the Labanotation system was expanded to allow it to convey the motivation or meaning behind movements. Kinetography Laban practitioners, on the other hand, tend to work within the constraints of the existing notation system, using spatial description alone to describe movement.

The International Council of Kinetography Laban was created in 1959 to clarify, standardize and eliminate differences between Labanotation and Kinetography Laban.  Thanks to this, one or both are currently used throughout the world almost interchangeably, and are readable to practitioners of either system.

Main concepts
Labanotation uses abstract symbols to define the:
 Direction and level of the movement
 Part of the body doing the movement
 Duration of the movement
 Dynamic quality of the movement

Direction and level of the movement
The shapes of the direction symbols indicate nine different directions in space and the shading of the symbol specifies the level of the movement.

Each "direction symbol" indicates the orientation of a line between the proximal and distal points of a body part or a limb.  That is, "the direction signs indicate the direction towards which the limbs must incline".

The direction symbols are organized as three levels: high, middle, and low (or deep):

Part of the body doing the movement

Labanotation is a record of the facts, the framework of the movement, so that it can be reproduced. 

The symbols are placed on a vertical staff, the horizontal dimension of the staff represents the symmetry of the body, and the vertical dimension represents time passing by. 

The location of a symbol on the staff defines the body part it represents. The centre line of the staff represents the centre line of the body, symbols on the right represent the right side of the body, symbols on the left, the left side.

Duration of the movement

The staff is read from bottom to top and the length of a symbol defines the duration of the movement. Drawing on western music notation, Labanotation uses bar lines to mark the measures and double bar lines at the start and end of the movement score. The starting position of the dancer can be given before the double bar lines at the start of the score.

Movement is indicated as "the transition from one point to the next", that is as one "directional destination" to the next.

Spatial distance, spatial relationships, transference of weight, centre of weight, turns, body parts, paths, and floor plans can all be notated by specific symbols.  Jumps are indicated by an absence of any symbol in the support column, indicating that no part of the body is touching the floor.

Dynamic quality of the movement

The dynamic quality is often indicated through the use of effort signs (see Laban Movement Analysis). 

The four effort categories are
 Space: Direct / Indirect
 Weight: Strong / Light
 Time: Sudden / Sustained
 Flow: Bound / Free

Dynamics in Labanotation are also indicated through a set of symbols indicating a rise or lowering of energy resulting from physical or emotional motive, e.g. physically forceful versus an intense emotional state.

Motif notation
Motif description, or the preferred term 'Motif notation', is closely related to Labanotation in its use of the same family of symbols and terminology. Labanotation is used for a literal, detailed description of movement so it can be reproduced as it was created or performed.  In contrast, Motif Notation highlights core elements and leitmotifs depicting the overall structure or essential elements of a movement sequence.  It can be used to set a structure for dance improvisation or for an educational exploration of movement concepts.  Not limited to dance, Motif Notation can be used to direct one's focus when learning to swing a golf club, the primary features of a character in a play, or the intent of a person's movement in a therapy session.

References

Further reading

 Hutchinson-Guest, Ann. (1983). Your Move: A New Approach to the Study of Movement and Dance. New York: Gordon and Breach. 
 Hutchinson-Guest, Ann. (1989). Choreo-Graphics; A Comparison of Dance Notation Systems from the Fifteenth Century to the Present. New York: Gordon and Breach. 
 Knust, Albrecht. (1948a). The development of the Laban kinetography (part I). Movement. 1 (1): 28–29. 
 Knust, Albrecht. (1948b). The development of the Laban kinetography (part II). Movement. 1 (2): 27-28. 
 Knust, Albrecht. (1979a). Dictionary of Kinetography Laban (Labanotation); Volume I: Text. Translated by A. Knust, D. Baddeley-Lang, S. Archbutt, and I. Wachtel. Plymouth: MacDonald and Evans.
 Knust, Albrecht. (1979b). Dictionary of Kinetography Laban (Labanotation); Volume II: Examples. Translated by A. Knust, D. Baddeley-Lang, S. Archbutt, and I. Wachtel. Plymouth: MacDonald and Evans.
 Laban, Rudolf (1975). Laban’s Principles of Dance and Movement Notation. 2nd edition edited and annotated by Roderyk Lange. London: MacDonald and Evans. (First published 1956.) 
 Laban, Rudoph. (1928). Schrifttanz. Wein: Universal.
 Preston-Dunlop, V. (1969). Practical Kinetography Laban. London: MacDonald and Evans.

External links

 Dance Notation Bureau website
 International Council of Kinetography Laban website
 Laban Lab (learn the basics of Labanotation)
 Albrecht Knust's Dictionary (dictionary of Kinetography Laban)

Dance research
Laban movement analysis